A hill chain, sometimes also hill ridge, is an elongated line of hills that usually includes a succession of more or less prominent hilltops, domed summits or kuppen, hill ridges and saddles and which, together with its associated lateral ridges and branches, may form a complex topographic structure. It may occur within a hill range, within an area of low rolling hill country or on a plain. It may link two or more otherwise distinct hill ranges. The transition from a hill chain to a mountain chain is blurred and depends on regional definitions of a hill or mountain.

The chain-like arrangement of hills in a chain is a consequence of their collective formation by mountain building forces or ice age earth movements. Hill chains generally have a uniform geological age, but may comprise several types of rock or sediment.

Hill chains normally form a watershed. They are crossed by roads that often use a natural saddle in the terrain.

Examples 
 the Argonne hill chain, in France.
 the Fläming south of Berlin in Germany.
 the Malvern Hills in central England.
 the ridge between the Taunus and Vogelsberg, which lies south of Giessen and forms the watershed between the Lahn valley and the Wetterau in Germany.

See also 
 Mountain chain

References

Literature 
 _ (1940). Proceedings/Geologists' Association. Vol. 51.
 Bünz, Enno (2008). Ostsiedlung und Landesausbau in Sachsen. Leipzig: LUV.
 Leggiere, Michael V. (2007). The Fall of Napoleon, Vol. 1. Cambridge: CUP.

External links 

Landforms